Thierry Frappé (born 23 May 1952) is a French politician of the National Rally (RN). He was elected to the National Assembly by Pas-de-Calais's 10th constituency in the 2022 election.

Biography
Born in Forest-sur-Marque, Nord, Frappé is a retired medical doctor. In 2020 he was elected to the town council in Bruay-la-Buissière, Pas-de-Calais, and became deputy mayor to RN mayor Ludovic Pajot, who named him as mayor delegate in the associated former commune of Labuissière in December 2021.

Pajot was elected a deputy in the National Assembly representing Pas-de-Calais's 10th constituency in 2017. He stepped down in 2021 and was replaced by Myriane Houplain, who left the RN for Éric Zemmour's new Reconquête party before the 2022 elections. Frappé was then chosen as the RN candidate in the constituency. In the first round, he received 47.73% of the votes, one of the party's best performances. In the second round, he had the party's best performance of the election, receiving 65.4% of the votes in the run-off against Ensemble Citoyens candidate Michel Dagbert.

Mandates
 Since 28 June 2020: First Deputy Mayor of Bruay-la-Buissière
 11 December 2021 - 9 July 2022: Deputy Mayor of Labuissière
 Since 22 June 2022: MP for the 10th constituency of Pas-de-Calais

References

1952 births
Living people
People from Nord (French department)
20th-century French physicians
21st-century French physicians
Mayors of places in Hauts-de-France
National Rally (France) politicians
Deputies of the 16th National Assembly of the French Fifth Republic